Pichaqani (Aymara pichaqa, phichaqa, piqacha a big needle, -ni a suffix, "the one with a big needle", also spelled Pichacani) is a  mountain in the Bolivian Andes. It is located in the Cochabamba Department, at the border of the Quillacollo Province, Sipe Sipe Municipality, and the Tapacarí Province. Pichaqani lies southeast of Yuraq Q'asa.

References 

Mountains of Cochabamba Department